The 1986 United States Senate election in Illinois was held on November 4, 1986. The incumbent Democrat U.S. Senator Alan J. Dixon won re-election to a second term. Until  2022, this was the most recent election in which an incumbent Senator won re-election to Illinois' Class 3 seat and was elected to more than one full term.

Primaries were held March 18, 1986.

Election information
The primaries and general elections coincided with those for House, as well as those for state offices.

Turnout
For the primaries, turnout was 21.84%, with 1,333,989 votes were cast.

For the general election, turnout was 52.01%, with 3,122,833 votes cast.

Democratic primary

Candidates 
 Alan J. Dixon, incumbent U.S. Senator
 Sheila Jones, perennial candidate

Results

Republican

Candidates 
 Judy Koehler, state representative
 George Ranney, executive at Inland Steel Company

Withdrew 
 Tom Corcoran, former congressman (1977-1985)

General election
Dixon easily won the senate race. Koehler fared poorly throughout most parts of the state, only winning 10 of the state's 102 counties.

Koehler's campaign was regarded as underfinanced.

See also 
 1986 United States Senate elections

References 

1986
Illinois
1986 Illinois elections